Penicillium allii-sativi is a fungus species of the genus Penicillium, section Chrysogena. It is one of several Penicillium species that  can produce penicillin in culture. The fungus has been found in Argentina, Bulgaria, France, Portugal, South Africa, and the United Kingdom. The specific epithet allii-sativi refers to the garlic plant, Allium sativum, from which the fungus was isolated.

See also
List of Penicillium species

References 

Fungi described in 2012
Fungi of Africa
Fungi of Europe
Fungi of South America
allii-sativi